The Collazo Shale is a geologic formation in Puerto Rico. It preserves fossils dating back to the Paleogene period.

See also

 List of fossiliferous stratigraphic units in Puerto Rico

References
 

Paleogene Puerto Rico
Shale formations of the United States
Geologic formations of the Caribbean
Neogene United States